Tamarindo, also commonly known as agua de tamarindo, is a non-alcoholic beverage made of tamarind, sugar, and water. The tamarind plant originated in Africa but has since been widely distributed on a global scale and is commonly found in tropical regions. The tamarind plant produces fruit pods containing pulp and seeds. Tamarind is a versatile ingredient that is used for a variety of commercial, culinary and medicinal purposes with the pulp being the most commonly used part of the tamarind plant, used in a range of beverages including tamarindo and other similar beverages such as Nam Ma Kham Wan in Thailand and Poha Beer in Ghana. Tamarind pulp offers a flavour that ranges from sour to sweet, making tamarindo a sour-sweet beverage (dependent on the amount of sugar added, as well as on the tamarind cultivar used) recognised as a popular flavour of aguas frescas, which is traditionally consumed in Latin America. Comprising only three ingredients, tamarindo involves a simple production process making it an easy beverage to prepare at home. Tamarindo has been produced commercially as a soda flavour, by companies such as Jarritos and Nestle, and distributed globally.

History 

The tamarind plant has origins in Africa where it has been commonly utilised as a shade tree. In the 4th century BC tamarind was common among the Greeks and ancient Egyptians and has since been distributed and cultivated in over 50 countries worldwide, notably in Asia (in particular the Indian subcontinent), and Latin America. During the 16th century tamarind was introduced into Mexico where it became commonly used as a flavour of aguas frescas. Aguas frescas are a type of non-alcoholic beverage, comprising water, sugar and one or more seasonal fruits, seeds, cereals or flowers which are sold primarily in Mexico and other Latin American countries and have since been introduced into the United States. Aguas frescas are commonly sold at street vendors as well as at restaurants and taquerias and are traditionally served from an authentic Mexican glass dispenser (a vitrolero) with a ladle and poured over ice. Aguas frescas are beverages typically enjoyed with meals or as a refreshing beverage (usually consumed in the warmer months). Tamarindo is one of the many popular flavours of aguas frescas, alongside other flavours such as horchata and hibiscus.

Ingredients 
Tamarindo consists of a combination of 3 ingredients: tamarind, water and sugar.

Tamarind 

The primary ingredient of tamarindo, tamarind (also known as Tamarindus indica L), is a legume, part of the family Fabaceae. Tamarind grows on tamarind trees which are typically found in tropical regions and grow to 24 meters high on average. The trees produce fruit in abundance, on average, for 50 to 60 years but can live for over 200 years. Tamarind trees produce brown fruit pods that enclose one to twelve reddish-brown seeds as well as pulp. High levels of tartaric acid makes tamarind fruit highly acidic, this acid is also a common component of other sour fruits such as raspberries and grapes. Depending on the ripeness of the tamarind fruit the taste of the pulp can range from sour to sweet, the more ripe the tamarind fruit, the sweeter it tastes due to increased sugar levels that balance out the proportion of tartaric acid. The pulp is the most commonly extracted part of the tamarind plant. Tamarind pulp contains high proportions of carbohydrates (41.1 to 61.4 grams per 100 grams) and low levels of fat (0.6 grams per 100 grams) and is high in various vitamins and minerals, including potassium (62 to 570 milligrams per 100g), calcium (81 to 466 milligrams per 100 grams) and phosphorus (86 to 190 milligrams per 100 grams). Tamarind seeds are also utilised as a food source as they contain high levels of protein (26.9 grams per 100 grams) and oil (10.9 grams per 100 grams) and in some countries, tamarind seeds are used as an emergency food because of their high protein levels. The leaves of the tamarind plant are high in calcium and protein and have been consumed by domestic animals and wild animals, including elephants, as a fodder.

Production 
Mature and protected tamarind trees can produce up to 150 to 225 kilograms of tamarind fruit per year, however on average, tamarind trees produce between 30 and 50 kilograms of fruit annually. The tamarind fruit is most commonly produced in its sour form and accounts for 95% of tamarind production worldwide with India (in particular the states of Madhya Pradesh, West Bengal and Karnataka) and Thailand being the largest Asian producers of tamarind and Mexico as the largest producer of tamarind in the Western hemisphere. The majority of African countries do not produce tamarind commercially, but it is commonly utilised by the local people. The pharmaceutical industry in America is responsible for processing 100 tonnes of tamarind pulp annually.

Uses 

Most parts of the tamarind tree (including the wood, bark, flowers, leaves, pulp and seeds) are used for a variety of commercial, culinary and medicinal purposes.

Commercial uses 
Tamarind trees are used as shade trees and ornamental trees (common along highways and in parks). Tamarind seeds are used in the production of tamarind kernel powder which is used as a sizing agent in the textile industry because of its ability to absorb water and swell up, in India, tamarind kernel powder has also been used as a sizing agent in the production of cotton. In Bengal, tamarind seeds are used in the production of an oil used in varnishes. The wood of the tamarind plant is used in carpentry (such as making furniture and wheels) and the leaves and flowers are used as a setting agent for dyes.

Culinary uses 
Tamarind pulp is the most common part of the tamarind plant utilised for culinary purposes, being used in a range of chutneys, curries, sauces (such as Worcestershire sauce and barbecue sauce) and beverages (such as tamarindo). In Sri Lanka tamarind pulp has been used as a lime alternative and in Senegal the pulp is mixed with sugar to produce sweet meats known as ‘bengal’. In India tamarind pulp is made into a juice used in the preservation of fish and in many countries of East Africa the pulp is used in the making of a dish called ‘ugali’ (a type of maize flour porridge). Tamarind fruits have been utilised in the production of tamarind syrup in Puerto Rico which is used by street vendors to flavour shaved ice. The seeds of the tamarind plant are also used for culinary purposes but the whole seed cannot be directly consumed and need to be soaked and boiled in water before they are edible. The seeds are commonly used in jellies, marmalades and jams because they contain pectin which gives them ‘jelly forming properties’ and have also been used as a stabiliser in the production of cheese, ice cream and mayonnaise. In Indonesia, after the seeds have been roasted, they are consumed as a snack accompanied with salt and grated coconut and in Thailand tamarind seeds are used as a coffee alternative.

Medicinal uses 
Different parts of the tamarind plant have been used globally for various medicinal purposes. In the northern parts of Nigeria, the roots of the tamarind plant are used to treat leprosy and in America tamarind pulp has been utilised as a laxative and to treat a range of ailments such as alleviating sunstroke and sore throats. In Thailand the pulp has been transformed into a tablet to reduce excess weight and in Brazil the pulp is used for its moisturising effects. The pulp has also been used in traditional medicine to treat colds, diarrhoea and to reduce inflammation.  Tamarind seeds have been used in powdered form to aid dysentery in India and Cambodia and in Ethiopia softened tamarind seeds are used to rid parasitic worms. The bark of the tamarind tree is used to treat malaria in Uganda and has been made into lotions in the Philippines to treat ulcers and boils.

Production 
There are different variations of tamarindo, however it is typically made by shelling the tamarind pods and adding them to boiling water. The pods are left to soak for approximately 45 minutes then the seeds are removed from the pods which leaves the pulp that is then strained through a sieve and blended with water and sugar. Store bought tamarind pulp can be used as an alternative to minimise the time required to prepare the tamarind pods. Once the ingredients are combined the beverage is served over ice. This process typically takes between 45 minutes to an hour to complete, but is dependent on if store bought tamarind pulp is used or how long the tamarind pods are left to soak. In the commercial production of tamarindo the beverage is carbonated, making it similar to a soft drink. The use of tamarind pulp in tamarindo makes the beverage a good source of potassium, calcium and carbohydrates and contains high levels of Vitamin B (Vitamin B1 - thiamine and Vitamin B3 - niacin) and small amounts of Vitamin C.

Producers 
Tamarindo is traditionally sold at street vendors throughout Latin America. Street vendors play an important role in Latin American culture as they comprise a significant portion of the informal economy and are responsible for providing many employment opportunities for local people. Street vendors typically sell food, beverages, clothing and other daily use items and have become introduced into the United States by immigrants as a way to reproduce experiences similar to that in their home countries. Tamarindo, along with various other flavours of aguas frescas, are common products sold at street vendors, taquerias and restaurants in both Latin America and the United States. Tamarindo is now commercially produced by a range of companies, such as Jarritos and Nestle, and distributed globally. Jarritos is a Mexican soft drink brand that was established in 1950 and has since been distributed into the United States and internationally. Jarritos offers a range of flavours alongside Tamarindo, including Mandarin, Lime and Guava. Global food and beverage company, Nestle, introduced three Latin American inspired flavours into the United States in 2011 which included Tamarindo, Horchata and Jamaica.

As explored by documentarist Ebony Bailey in her documentary titled "Jamaica y Tamarindo: Afro Tradition in the Heart of Mexico," Afro-Mexicans have long developed a kinship tie with tamarindo. Alongside the coast of Guerrero, we see a thriving informal sector of Afro-Mexican vendors. Most Mexicans are unaware that tamarind is an African plant, leading to the erasure of African and Afro-Mexican culture and customs.

Variations 
There are a range of beverages, similar to tamarindo, that utilise tamarind as the primary component.

Poha Beer 
Poha Beer is a tamarind based beverage, composed primarily of tamarind pulp in addition to spices, such as ginger and peppercorn, commonly consumed in Ghana. The preparation of Poha Beer involves seven key stages including: threshing (removal of the outer covering of the fruit), fermenting (the fruit is covered in water and left to ferment), moulding (the fruit is moulded into balls), soaking (the pulp is extracted by leaving the fruits to soak in warm or cold water), mashing (the fruits are mashed to extract more pulp), decanting (the removal of unwanted materials) and spicing (spices, such as ginger and peppercorns, are added to flavour).

Nam Ma Kham Wan 

Nam Ma Kham Wan is a popular beverage consumed in Thailand made with tamarind pulp, water, salt and sugar. The tamarind pulp is mixed and blended with water then boiled. Salt and sugar are then added to the mixture which is then cooled and served over ice.

Nuoc Da Me 
Nuoc Da Me is a tamarind based beverage typically consumed in Vietnam. It is a simple drink to make involving tamarind pulp being mixed with sugar and water which is then served over a glass filled with ice, water and any type of nut (usually peanuts).

Imli Ka Amlana 
Imli Ka Amlana is a tamarind based beverage consumed in India made by combining various spices (usually black salt, black pepper, cardamom powder and cumin powder) and sugar with tamarind pulp and serving it chilled over ice. Imli Ka Amlana was made available for commercial consumption by Paper Boats but the product has now since been discontinued.

See also
 Tamarind juice

Reference list 

Aguas frescas
Cuisine of the Americas
Mexican drinks